Paul Harmsworth (born 28 September 1963 in Ealing) is a British former sprinter. He represented Great Britain and Northern Ireland at the 1988 Olympic Games in the 4 × 400 m relay, running in the preliminary round as the British team (with Brian Whittle, Kriss Akabusi, Todd Bennett, and Phil Brown running in the final) finished fifth.

Harmsworth was a medallist at the 1987 European Athletics Indoor Championships, coming third in the 400 metres, and finished in fifth place at the 1987 IAAF World Indoor Championships, where he was number one European. Nationally, he was the British indoor champion that same year. He was the 1980 British youth champion in 1980. He also set British and Commonwealth indoor records in the 4 × 400 m in 1987, and outdoors in the 4 × 200 m in 1988.

References

1963 births
Living people
Athletes (track and field) at the 1988 Summer Olympics
Olympic athletes of Great Britain
English male sprinters
British male sprinters
People from Ealing
Athletes from London